John Sumter Bull (September 25, 1934 – August 11, 2008), was an American naval officer and aviator, fighter pilot, test pilot, mechanical and aeronautical engineer, and NASA astronaut.

Biography

Early life and education
Bull was born on September 25, 1934, in Memphis, Tennessee, where he attended primary and secondary schools and graduated in 1952 from Central High School. He received a Bachelor of Science degree in mechanical engineering from Rice University in 1957. Bull took leave from working at NASA Ames to earn a Master of Science and Ph.D. degrees from Stanford University in Aeronautical Engineering in 1971 and 1973, respectively.

In his youth, he was active in the Boy Scouts of America.

Navy service
Bull joined the U.S. Navy in June 1957. Following his flight training, from March 1959 to November 1960, he flew the F-3 Demon and F-4 Phantom II while assigned to VF-114 at the Naval Air Station in Mirimar, California.

Bull graduated from the U.S. Naval Test Pilot School in February 1964, as an outstanding graduate. He was a project test pilot in the Carrier Suitability Branch  at the Naval Air Test Center at Patuxent River, Maryland, at the time of his astronaut selection.

He logged more than 2,100 hours flying time; 1,800 hours in jet aircraft.

NASA career

Bull was selected in 1966 as a member of NASA Astronaut Group 5. Together with Ken Mattingly and Gerald Carr, Bull was named on November 20, 1967, to the support crew for the second Apollo manned flight of the Saturn V, Apollo 8, to assist prime and backup crew members as they trained. Bull was also chosen as Lunar Module Pilot, with James Irwin as Commander, for LTA-8, an environmental qualification test of the Apollo Lunar Module in a vacuum chamber at the Houston Space Environment Simulation Laboratory. Just before the May–June 1968 test, Bull was found to have a severe sinus problem, and was replaced with his backup, a Grumman consulting pilot. Bull was subsequently diagnosed as suffering from pulmonary disease, and resigned from the astronaut corps in July 1968. Following his retirement, he received a job at NASA Ames.

After receiving his Ph.D., Bull returned to NASA and worked at the Ames Research Center from 1973 to 1985, where he conducted simulation and flight test research in advanced flight systems for both helicopters and fixed-wing aircraft. Around 1983, he became chief of the Aircraft Systems Branch. From 1986 until his retirement from NASA in 1989, he managed NASA-wide research programs in autonomous systems technology for space applications. He continued working with Ames as a consultant until his final retirement in 1997.

Personal life
Bull was married to the former Nancy Laraine Gustafson of Seattle, Washington, with two sons and a daughter: Jeffrey Tyler (July 27, 1965 – January 28, 1977), Scott A. (born December 30, 1968) and Whitney A. (born August 1, 1971), and four grandchildren.

Illness and death
Bull died on August 11, 2008, at the age of 73 in South Lake Tahoe, California, due to complications related to long-term asthma.

Organizations
Bull was a member of the Society of Experimental Test Pilots, Sigma Tau Engineering Fraternity, Tau Beta Pi Engineering Fraternity, Sigma Xi, American Helicopter Society, and American Institute of Aeronautics and Astronautics.

References

External links

Astronautix biography of John S. Bull

1934 births
2008 deaths
People from Memphis, Tennessee
Rice University alumni
Respiratory disease deaths in California
Deaths from asthma
NASA people
United States Navy officers
United States Naval Aviators
American test pilots
American mechanical engineers
American aerospace engineers
American aviators
Aviators from Tennessee
United States Naval Test Pilot School alumni
United States Navy astronauts
Stanford University alumni
20th-century American engineers